Nesheim Church is a parish church of the Church of Norway in Vaksdal Municipality in Vestland county, Norway. It is located in the village of Nesheim. It is the church for the Nesheim parish which is part of the Hardanger og Voss prosti (deanery) in the Diocese of Bjørgvin. The white, wooden church was built in a long church design in 1908 using plans drawn up by the architect Adolf Schirmer (one source credits Hartvig Sverdrup Eckhoff). The church seats about 120 people.

History
The church was consecrated on 17 September 1908 by the Bishop Johan Willoch Erichsen. Originally the church had a small sacristy adjacent to the chancel, but in 1973, the old sacristy was enlarged.

See also
List of churches in Bjørgvin

References

Vaksdal
Churches in Vestland
Long churches in Norway
Wooden churches in Norway
20th-century Church of Norway church buildings
Churches completed in 1908
1908 establishments in Norway